XHRLK-FM is a radio station in Atlacomulco, State of Mexico, Mexico.

History
XERLK-AM 1340 received its concession on July 30, 1973. It has always been owned by Miled Libien Kahue, though it has moved frequencies twice. In the 1990s, it moved to 1170 kHz, allowing it to go from 500 watts as a daytimer to 1,000 watts and 250 at night. It then migrated to FM in 2011 as XHRLK-FM 104.7.

References

Regional Mexican radio stations
Radio stations in the State of Mexico